The 2014 Indian general election in Uttarakhand, occurred for 5 seats in the state. All 5 seats were won by the Bharatiya Janata Party.

Opinion polls

Results
The results of the elections were declared on 16 May 2014.

Elected MPs
Following is the list of elected MPs from Uttarakhand.

See also 

 Elections in Uttarakhand
 Politics of Uttarakhand
 2014 Indian general election
 16th Lok Sabha
 List of members of the 16th Lok Sabha

References

Uttarakhand
Indian general elections in Uttarakhand